Major Eustace Wyndham Maude, 7th Viscount Hawarden  (20 September 1877 – 6 April 1958) was a British Army officer, peer and colonial official.

Maude was the son of Ludlow Eustace Maude and Clara Louisa Madden, and the great-grandson of Cornwallis Maude, 1st Viscount Hawarden. He was educated at Bloxham School and the Royal Military College, Sandhurst. He was commissioned into the 3rd Battalion, Hampshire Regiment on 4 April 1900. He was promoted to Major in 1910 while serving with the Queen's Royal Regiment (West Surrey) in Egypt. He succeeded to the title Viscount Hawarden on 26 August 1914. It was due to the battlefield death of his cousin, Lt. Robert Cornwallis Maude, at Mons. He saw active service in the First World War, during which he was mentioned in dispatches. He was subsequently a provincial governor in Anglo-Egyptian Sudan. He held the office of Justice of the Peace.

He married Marion Wright, daughter of Albert Leslie Wright of Butterley Hall and Margaretta Agnes Plumptre, on 17 November 1920. Together they had three children.

References

1877 births
1958 deaths
British Army personnel of World War I
British colonial governors and administrators in Africa
British colonial officials
Graduates of the Royal Military College, Sandhurst
English justices of the peace
People educated at Bloxham School
Queen's Royal Regiment officers
Royal Hampshire Regiment officers
Viscounts Hawarden
Anglo-Egyptian Sudan people
Maude family